Michel Brunet (July 24, 1917 in Montreal – September 4, 1985 in Montreal) was a Quebec historian and essayist. He received his B.A. and M.A. from the Université de Montréal and received his Ph.D. from Clark University in Worcester, Massachusetts, U.S.A.

He was chair of the history department at the Université de Montréal from 1959 to 1968. Before becoming an academic, he worked for several years as a schoolteacher. Together with fellow Université de Montreal professors Guy Frégault and Maurice Séguin, he formed part of the "Montreal School" of French-Canadian history.

He was also president de l'Institut d'histoire de l'Amérique française for 1970–1971.

Publications
1954 - Canadians et Canadiens
1958 - La Présence anglaise et les Canadiens
1969 - Les Canadiens après la conquête, 1759–1775
1975 - Histoire politique, économique et sociale du Québec et des Québécois: le premier centenaire de l'État du Québec
1976 - Notre passé, le présent et nous
1977 - Analyse de l'efficacité de la Société de développement industriel du Québec

Honours
1969 - Prix Jean-Hamelin, Les Canadiens après la conquête, 1759–1775 : de la révolution canadienne à la révolution américaine
1969 - Governor General's Award, Les Canadiens après la conquête
1970 - Prix France-Québec
1970 - Prix Ludger-Duvernay
1983 - Prix Léon-Gérin
Member of the Académie des lettres du Québec.

References

Université de Montréal - A tradition of research, 1946
Historica - How Historians Complicate Things, by Margaret Conrad Not found 31 March 2019 at https://www.historicacanada.ca/
Archives de l'Université de Montréal - Michel Brunet
l'Université de Montréal - 125th Anniversary Celebrations - Michel Brunet

1917 births
1985 deaths
Canadian male non-fiction writers
Canadian writers in French
Governor General's Award-winning non-fiction writers
Academics in Quebec
Historians from Quebec
Writers from Quebec
Université de Montréal alumni
Clark University alumni
Academic staff of the Université de Montréal
20th-century Canadian historians
Historians of Quebec
Canadian expatriates in the United States